Gangadharpur Gram panchayat is the local self-government of the village. The panchayat is divided into wards and each ward is represented by an elected ward member. The ward members are headed by a Sarpanch. 
Gangadharpur Gram panchayat areas in Chanditala I CD Block in Srirampore subdivision of Hooghly district in the state of West Bengal, India .

Geography
Gangadharpur gram panchayat located at the Chanditala I CD block .
Villages and census towns in Gangadharpur gram panchayat are: Bankrishnapur, Gangadharpur(CT), Malipukur and Manirampur(CT).

Healthcare
Gangdharpur has a Primary Health Centre with 10 beds.

References

 

Gram panchayats in West Bengal